San Antonio de Padua is a Romanesque-style Franciscan church in Avilés, community of Asturias, Spain. The church has chapels added later to church.

See also
Asturian art
Catholic Church in Spain

References

Churches in Asturias
13th-century Roman Catholic church buildings in Spain
Romanesque architecture in Asturias